E. bidentata may refer to:

 Ensliniana bidentata, a leafcutter bee
 Epermenia bidentata, a fringe-tufted moth
 Eudonia bidentata, a grass moth
 Euglossa bidentata, an orchid bee